Neptis seeldrayersi, or Seeldrayer's sailer, is a butterfly in the family Nymphalidae. It is found in Ghana, Nigeria, Cameroon, the Republic of the Congo, the Democratic Republic of the Congo, Uganda, western Kenya and possibly Ivory Coast. The habitat consists of forests.

References

Butterflies described in 1895
seeldrayersi
Butterflies of Africa